Melete is a Neotropical genus of butterflies in the family Pieridae. The genus was erected by William John Swainson in 1831.

Species
Melete calymnia (C. Felder & R. Felder, 1862)
Melete leucadia (C. Felder & R. Felder, 1862)
Melete leucanthe (C. Felder & R. Felder, 1861)
Melete lycimnia (Cramer, 1777)
Melete polyhymnia (C. Felder & R. Felder, 1865)
Melete salacia (Godart, 1819)

References

Pierini
Pieridae of South America
Pieridae genera
Taxa named by William John Swainson